First Lady of Tajikistan is the title attributed to the wife of the Head of State of Tajikistan. The current first lady of Tajikistan is Azizmo Asadullayeva, wife of President Emomali Rahmon.

First ladies of Tajikistan

See also 
 President of Tajikistan

References 

First Ladies of Tajikistan
Tajikistan